Look on the bright side is an English language idiom that suggests trying to be optimistic.

Look on the bright side may also refer to: 
 "Always Look on the Bright Side of Life", song from Monty Python's Life of Brian
Looking on the Bright Side (1932), a British musical comedy film
Lookin' on the Bright Side (1993), an album by Harold Mabern
On the Bright Side Festival, an annual Australian music festival held in Perth, Western Australia

See also
The Bright Side (disambiguation)
Look on the Blight Side, 2013 album by Louis Logic